Shawn Vestal is an American author based in the state of Washington. He is best known for his collection of short stories, Godforsaken Idaho, which earned him the PEN Robert W. Bingham Prize in 2014. He currently lives in Spokane where he is a columnist for The Spokesman-Review. He and his wife Amy Cabe have a son, Cole Vestal.

Bibliography
 Godforsaken Idaho (2013) Little A/New Harvest 
 Daredevils (2016) Penguin Press

References

1966 births
Writers from Spokane, Washington
Former Latter Day Saints
Living people